Vladimir Klos is a Czech-born German former ballet dancer.

He was born in Prague.

Klos was a principal dancer with Stuttgart Ballet from 1972-97.

Since 1968, Klos has been in "a private as well as professional partnership" with fellow dancer Birgit Keil.

References

German male ballet dancers
Living people
Dancers from Prague
Year of birth missing (living people)